The 1925–26 season was the 31st season of competitive football by Southampton, and the club's fourth in the Second Division of the Football League. After finishing in the top half of the league table in their first three seasons in the division, Southampton had their worst year to date in the second flight when they finished in 14th place, ending just six points above the first relegation position. The club suffered a string of losses at the beginning of the campaign, leaving them with points to make up in later months. Former player Arthur Chadwick was brought in as Southampton's new manager in October, and the club subsequently secured their position in the Second Division with a run of wins over the Christmas period, despite continuing to lose points. The club finished in 14th place with 15 wins, eight draws and 19 losses.

In the 1925–26 FA Cup (the first in which all First and Second Division clubs entered at the third round), Southampton faced top-flight side Liverpool at The Dell for the third year running in the tournament. The game finished goalless, and the Saints were eliminated in the replay by a single goal. As usual, the club ended the season with two games against local rivals Portsmouth, for the Rowland Hospital Cup and the Hampshire Benevolent Cup, respectively. Pompey won both games, beating the Saints 4–2 at The Dell in the former and 5–1 at Fratton Park in the latter. The club also played five additional friendly games during the campaign, beating Portsmouth in September and Leicester City in March, drawing with Corinthian in January and Guildford United in April, and losing to Bournemouth & Boscombe Athletic in April.

Southampton used 29 different players during the 1925–26 season and had 14 different goalscorers. The club's top scorer was centre-forward Bill Rawlings, who scored 20 goals in the Second Division and one in the Hampshire Benevolent Cup. Six new players were signed by the club during the campaign, with eight released and sold to other clubs. The average attendance at The Dell during the 1925–26 season was 9,806. The highest attendance was 18,391 for the FA Cup third round tie against Liverpool on 9 January 1926; the lowest was around 5,000 against Oldham Athletic in the league on 27 March 1926. The season was the club's last to feature long-time forward Arthur Dominy, who left on a free transfer to join First Division side Everton in the summer of 1926, having made almost 400 appearances for the Saints.

Background and transfers
At the end of the 1924–25 season, several players left Southampton. Amongst the departures were a number of players who had spent only a season with the club: outside-left Fred Price joined Wolverhampton Wanderers, Scottish centre-half John Callagher signed for Third Division North side Wigan Borough, right-half Dennis Jones left for Midland League champions Mansfield Town, and outside-right Tommy Broad was sold to Weymouth in the Southern League. Albert Barrett, a wing-half who had only joined from West Ham United in February, left in June to join Fulham. Scottish forward Willie McCall joined Queen of the South on a permanent basis in September, having spent the previous season on loan at the club. The club also added several players in the summer, signing outside-right Cuthbert Coundon from North Eastern League club Jarrow, inside-left Frank Matthews from Second Division rivals Barnsley, and Welsh forward Ernest Turner from Third Division South side Merthyr Town.

One of the later signings of the summer was goalkeeper Len Hill, who joined from Queens Park Rangers in June 1925. Regular keeper Tommy Allen had turned down a new contract at the club, leading to the signing of Hill as his replacement. Allen later agreed to new terms in October and returned to his place as first-choice Southampton goalkeeper, with Hill making sporadic appearances later in the season. Transfer activity continued throughout the season. In December 1925 the club signed inside-forward Jim Swinden from Salisbury City, following a trial in which he scored two goals on his debut for the reserve side against Folkestone. In March 1926, right-half Bill Adams joined from Southern League side Guildford United. Needing money to purchase the freehold of The Dell, Southampton sold mainstay full-backs Fred Titmuss and Tom Parker in early 1926 – the former in February to Plymouth Argyle for £1,750; the latter in March to Arsenal for £3,250 – which "caused uproar amongst supporters".

Players transferred in

Players transferred out

Second Division

The 1925–26 season started off poorly for Southampton, who lost their first four matches of the campaign and scored only two goals to find themselves at the bottom of the Second Division league table. The run included a 3–1 home defeat to local rivals Portsmouth described by club historians as a "particularly bitter blow", and a 4–0 loss at fellow mid-table side Hull City. After picking up their first points with a win over Nottingham Forest and a draw at Derby County, Southampton appointed former half-back Arthur Chadwick as the club's new manager, after secretary George Goss and the board of directors had been temporarily managing the club following Jimmy McIntyre's departure the previous December. The team's position in the league slowly began to improve as they picked up a few more points, including 4–1 wins over Darlington and Swansea Town, before another run of four losses leading up to Christmas left them 19th in the table, one point above the relegation zone with more games played than teams below.

After being eliminated from the FA Cup at the first hurdle, Southampton's fortunes in the league began to change. The club won four out of four games between 16 January and 10 February 1926, including a 2–1 win over Portsmouth at Fratton Park and a 5–0 thrashing of fellow strugglers Bradford City at Valley Parade – their biggest win in the Second Division. The Saints continued to pick up important wins throughout the final months of the season, allowing them to secure a mid-table finish with games remaining. Highlights included a 4–2 victory over promotion hopefuls Wolverhampton Wanderers and a 3–1 defeat of Oldham Athletic, who would finish seventh in the league. The side remained in 14th place for the last five games of the season, where they finished with 15 wins, eight draws and 19 losses. Club historians described Southampton's 1925–26 campaign as "a disappointing season", noting that it ended with "rumblings off the field" following the controversial transfers of Tom Parker and Fred Titmuss.

List of match results

Final league table

Results by matchday

FA Cup

The 1925–26 FA Cup was the first edition of the competition in which all First Division and Second Division clubs entered at the third round. Southampton entered the tournament at home to Liverpool, who they were facing for the third consecutive year – they had lost in 1923–24, and had won in 1924–25. The hosts entered the game with regular starters Bert Shelley and Cliff Price unavailable due to injury, and during the match goalkeeper Tommy Allen suffered bruised ribs in a collision with defender Michael Keeping, forcing him to leave the field. Half-back Arthur Bradford took over in goal, and the Saints held on for a goalless draw. In the replay at Anfield four days later, Southampton succumbed to a 1–0 defeat by the top-flight side, with Dick Forshaw scoring the only goal of the game after 65 minutes.

Other matches
Outside of the league and the FA Cup, Southampton played seven additional first-team matches during the 1925–26 season. The first was a friendly against local rivals Portsmouth at Fratton Park on 23 September 1925, a testimonial for former Pompey (and briefly Saints) full-back Jack Warner. The visitors won the game 3–0, with Jimmy Bullock at centre-forward scoring all three goals – the first a "glorious shot" in the 36th minute, and the other two in the Southampton-dominated second half. On 28 January 1926 the club faced amateur side Corinthian at The Dell, drawing 3–3 with goals from Bill Rawlings (two) and Bill Henderson. On 15 March they hosted Leicester City in a benefit match for Tommy Allen and Bert Shelley, beating the recently promoted First Division club 2–0 thanks to a brace from Frank Matthews. In April the club played two more friendly matches, drawing 1–1 with Guildford United at Joseph's Road and losing 1–0 to Bournemouth & Boscombe Athletic at Dean Court.

As in previous years, Southampton ended the 1925–26 season with two more matches against Portsmouth, competing for the Rowland Hospital Cup and the Hampshire Benevolent Cup. The first meeting, on 3 May 1926 for the former trophy, was a high-scoring affair ending in a 4–2 win for the visiting Pompey side. A George Harkus own goal opened the scoring, after he passed back to goalkeeper James Thitchener, who controlled the ball but was already over the goal line. Michael Keeping equalised with a penalty after a handball by John McColgan, but by half-time it was 3–1 against the Saints following another own goal and a McColgan penalty. In the second half, Jerry Mackie added a fourth for Pompey before Jimmy Bullock scored a second consolation goal for the hosts. Two days later, the sides met again at Fratton Park for the Hampshire Benevolent Cup. The hosts were victorious again, in a similarly high-scoring game, as they thrashed Southampton 5–1. The club were 3–0 up at half-time through goals from Goodwin and a Willie Haines brace, before Haines completed his hat-trick in the second half and Haywood scored a fifth. Bill Rawlings scored the consolation goal for the travelling Southampton side.

Player details
Southampton used 29 different players during the 1925–26 season, 14 of whom scored during the campaign. The team played in a 2–3–5 formation throughout the campaign, using two full-backs, three half-backs, two outside forwards, two inside forwards and a centre-forward. Left-half Stan Woodhouse made the most appearances during the season, playing in 37 of 42 league matches, both FA Cup matches and the Rowland Hospital Cup. Centre-forward Bill Rawlings missed seven league games, while outside-right Bill Henderson appeared in all but eight league games and the Rowland Hospital Cup. Rawlings finished the season as the club's top scorer, with 20 goals in the league and one in the Hampshire Benevolent Cup. Inside-left Cliff Price scored seven goals in his 16 league appearances. Woodhouse was the top-scoring half-back of the season with two league goals, and Michael Keeping was the top-scoring full-back with two goals in the Second Division and one in the Rowland Hospital Cup.

Squad statistics

Notes

Most appearances

Top goalscorers

References

Bibliography

External links
Southampton F.C. official website

Southampton F.C. seasons
Southampton